Withering away of the state is a Marxist concept coined by Friedrich Engels referring to the idea that, with the realization of socialism, the state will eventually become obsolete and cease to exist as society will be able to govern itself without the state and its coercive enforcement of the law.

Origin of the phrase 
The phrase stems  from Friedrich Engels, who wrote in part 3, chapter 2 of Anti-Dühring (1878):

A related quote from Engels comes from Origins of the Family, Private Property, and the State (1884):

Interpretations 

Although Engels first introduced the idea of the withering away of the state, he attributed the underlying concept to Karl Marx, and other Marxist theorists—including Vladimir Lenin—would later expand on it. According to this concept of the withering away of the state, eventually a communist society will no longer require coercion to induce individuals to behave in a way that benefits the entire society. Such a society would occur after a temporary period of the dictatorship of the proletariat.

It proceeds from the concept of the transformation of the state in the previous stage of society called socialism. Engels posits that—similar to the arguments made by Henri de Saint-Simon before him—in a socialist society public organization would become primarily concerned with technical issues such as the optimal allocation of resources and determination of production as opposed to drafting and enforcing laws and thus the traditional state functions would gradually become irrelevant and unnecessary for the functioning of society. Engels argued that the state transforms itself from a "government of people" to an "administration of things" and thus would not be a state in the traditional sense of the term.

This scenario depended on Marx's view of coercive power as a tool of those who own the means of production, i.e. certain social classes (the bourgeoisie) and the capitalist state. In a communist society, the social classes would disappear and the means of production would have no single owner, hence such a stateless society will no longer require law and stateless communist society will develop.

The concept of the withering away of the state differentiates traditional Marxism from state socialism (which accepts the retention of the institution of the state) and anti-statist anarchism (which demands the immediate abolition of the state with no perceived need for any "temporary" post-revolutionary institution of the state).

In the Soviet Marxism of the Soviet Union, Lenin supported the idea of the withering away of the state as seen in his The State and Revolution (1917). Joseph Stalin's government mentioned it occasionally, but did not believe the world was yet in the advanced stage of development where the state could wither away. He believed that at least in the short term the state had to have enough power to strike back against those elements seeking to derail the ultimate victory of communism. For example, Stalin believed a war between socialism and capitalism was inevitable or at least highly likely, therefore requiring a strong socialist state with which to wage this war. The Stalin-era Soviet Union marginalized the notion of the withering of the state, as the state became more powerful and entrenched.

See also 

 "From each according to his ability, to each according to his needs"
 Post-scarcity economy
 State failure

References

Further reading 
 
 
 
 
 
 

Marxism
Political catchphrases
Socialist law